Vechirniy bulvar is a station on the Kryvyi Rih Metrotram. Opened as part of the first stage on 26 December 1986, it was the first proper Metro-type underground station in the system. Located in the middle of a tunnel stretch that is of 2.3 kilometers in length which was built to avoid physically dividing the 6th microraion by the Metrotram's tracks, as the original 1970s designs called for. 

The station is a shallow level design with two side platforms and a row of pillars in between. Decoratively, the pillars are faced with pink marble, whilst the top of the walls are faced with dark red ceramic tiles, and the bottom with beige marble. The floor is laid with gray granite.

The station's single vestibule - rotunda, is located on the intersection between the Bulvarnyi, Pavla Hlazovoho and Kosmonavtiv streets. Until 2016 the station was named Maidan Artema after an eponymous city square (today called Ploshcha Oleksandra Polia), actually located a fair distance away from the station, which held a massive statue of the Bolshevik Fyodor Sergeyev (nicknamed Artyom), the chairman of the Commissariat of the Donetsk Krivoy Rog Soviet Republic.

External links
 Mir Metro - Description and photos
Google maps - Satellite shot.

Kryvyi Rih Metrotram stations